Global warming refers to the mainly human-caused rise in average temperature of the Earth's climate system. In the English-language Wikipedia, references to global warming are automatically redirected to the article on climate change.

Global warming may also refer to:

 a long-term rise in:
global surface temperature
ocean heat content
 Earth's Energy Imbalance, a measurable change in the planet's radiative equilibrium which quantifies its heating (or cooling) rate
 Global Warming (Pitbull album), 2012
 Global Warming (Sonny Rollins album), 1998
 Global Warming: The Signs and The Science, a 2005 documentary film made by ETV
 Global Warming: What You Need to Know, a 2006 documentary directed by Nicolas Brown
 "Global Warming", a 2005 song by Gojira from the album From Mars to Sirius

See also

Global Warning (disambiguation)